The CCRC, which stand for Canadian Christian Radio Chart, is a Canadian record chart compiled and published by Ten16 Entertainment. The chart currently tracks the top 30 songs of the week according to airplay on twelve Canadian Christian radio stations. A year-end chart with 100 position is also compiled. Radio stations can subscribe via its web site to have the chart e-mailed to them every Monday morning. Its web site also lists the current week's chart, but does not currently archive charts for past weeks, as well it lists the year-end carts from 2012 to 2015. The CCRC has been around since at least February 2, 2013.

Tracked stations
CJSI-FM
CJRY-FM
CJGY-FM
CJTW-FM
CINB-FM
CKGW-FM
CHRI-FM
CJLF-FM
CKJJ-FM
CJFY-FM
CJJC-FM
Stingray Music

See also
Christian radio
CT-20

References

External links
Official website

Canadian record charts
Christian music media